Baryatinsky District is an administrative and municipal district (raion), one of the twenty-four in Kaluga Oblast, Russia. It is located in the west of the oblast. Its administrative center is the rural locality (a selo) of Baryatino. Population:    6,614 (2002 Census);  The population of Baryatino accounts for 43.3% of the district's total population.

Geography   
Baryatinsky District is located in the western region of Kaluga Oblast, on the Baryatinsky-Suhinichskoy plain.   Most of the district is on karst terrain, with plains covering most of the south, and ridges up to 279 meters in the north on the border with Smolensk Oblast.  About 40 percent of the region is deciduous forest (birch, aspen, spruce, pine).  The divide between the Dnieper River basin and the Volga River basin runs through the district, with rivers in the south of the district flowing south to the Dnieper.  The district is 100 km west of the city of Kaluga, and about 240 km southwest of Moscow  The area measures 40 km (north-south), and 40 km (west-east).  The administrative center is the town of Baryatino.

The district is bordered on the north by Mosalsky District, on the east by Sukhinichsky District, on the south by Kirovsky District, and on the west by Spas-Demensky District.  A small portion borders Smolensk Oblast on the north.

References

Notes

Sources

External links
Baryatinsky District on Google Maps
Baryatinsky District on OpenStreetMap

Districts of Kaluga Oblast